Evansburg is a hamlet in west-central Alberta, Canada, within Yellowhead County. The hamlet is adjacent to the Pembina River and the Pembina River Provincial Park.

Evansburg was previously incorporated as a village until June 30, 1998, when it dissolved to become a hamlet within Yellowhead County. Statistics Canada recognizes Evansburg as a designated place.

History 
Evansburg is named after Harry Marshall Erskine Evans, former Edmonton mayor and advisor to the Government of Alberta. The post office dates back to 1914.

Demographics 

Arts and culture 
The Tipple Park Museum preserves and showcases Evansburg's railway, agricultural and coal mining history. The museum's symbol is a tipple, or a structure at a mine used to load ore or coal.

Home of the Grouch 

Evansburg has gained a degree of fame across Canada for being the "Home of the Grouch." Every August, as part of the community's Pembina Valley Daze festival, the community chooses the "Town Grouch".

The tradition began in 1961, when local artist John Lauer was commissioned to create a new welcome sign for the community. To add some humour to the sign, he listed Evansburg's population as "603 people, 29 dogs, 41 cats, and one grouch." Speculation began as to who the grouch was. In 1979, the Evansburg Chamber of Commerce decided to settle the question by holding an election, in which the community's grouch was elected by the people. The election has been held annually ever since. Lauer himself was elected the grouch in 1995.

In the 1990s, Evansburg decided to capitalize on this tradition by adopting the slogan "Home of the Grouch" and using a scowling coal miner (to also honour its coal mining heritage) as its logo.

Far from being an honorary title, the Town Grouch has become a real position with real responsibilities. The chosen citizen becomes Evansburg's ambassador, and represents the community at trade shows and conferences across Canada. Town Grouch is given a uniform consisting of overalls, a pick-axe, and a miner's helmet, all designed to mimic the community's logo.  The Town Grouch's home also gets the honorary address of "10 Frowning Street."

In recent years, the election has been replaced with a competition to see who can raise the most money for Pembina Valley Daze.

Infrastructure 

Transportation
As a flag stop Via Rail's The Canadian calls at the Evansburg railway station three times per week in each direction.

See also 

List of communities in Alberta
List of designated places in Alberta
List of former urban municipalities in Alberta
List of hamlets in Alberta

References 

Designated places in Alberta
Former villages in Alberta
Hamlets in Alberta
Yellowhead County
Populated places disestablished in 1998